Below is a list of major tourist attractions in Zaragoza, Spain.

Monuments 
 Aljafería (fortified medieval palace; part of the World Heritage Site Mudéjar Architecture of Aragon)
 Old Stock Exchange (16th c.)
 Stone bridge (15th c.)

Religious sites 
 La Seo Cathedral -- part of the World Heritage Site Mudéjar Architecture of Aragon; gothic high altar in polychrome alabaster by Pere Johan (1394/1397 - after 1458)
 El Pilar Basilica -- high altar in alabaster by Damián Forment (1515–1518), frescoes by Francisco de Goya
 Church of San Pablo -- part of the World Heritage Site Mudéjar Architecture of Aragon; high altar by Damián Forment (1515–1518)
 Renaissance mudejar churches: San Miguel de los Navarros, San Gil Abad, Santa María Magdalena
 Church of Santa Engracia de Zaragoza (two Early Christian sarcophagi in the crypt)
 Santo Sepulcro Convent in Zaragoza

Museums 
 Museum of Zaragoza
 Roman Museums: Theater Museum, Baths Museum, Port Museum, Forum Museum, and Roman Walls
 Alma Mater Museum (old Diocesan Museum of Zaragoza)
 Museo Goya - Colección Ibercaja - Museo Camón Aznar
 Tapestry museum (inside La Seo Cathedral)
 Frescoes in the Cartuja de Aula Dei
 Origami Museum of Zaragoza (EMOZ; first origami museum in Europe)

Open spaces 
 El Pilar Square
 "Big Park" (connected to the Venice Pine Forest [Pinar de Venecia] and the amusement park)
 Luis Buñuel Park and nearby area of the Expo 2008
 Galachos de Juslibol (oxbow lakes formed by the Ebro river 2 km outside Zaragoza)

Modern architecture 
 Torre del Agua
 Bridge Pavilion

Festivals and festivities 
 El Pilar festival
 Holy Week festivities

Other 
 Aquarium of Zaragoza (biggest freshwater aquarium in Europe)
 El Tubo (a few narrow streets in the old part of Zaragoza, renown for their tapas and the cabaret El Plata)

References 

Tourist attractions in Zaragoza
Zaragoza
Zaragoza